Hedylus (Hḗdylos; fl. 3rd century BC) was a Greek epigrammatic poet of the Hellenistic period. 

Hedylus was the son of Melicertus and Hedyle, and a native of Samos or Athens. His epigrams were included in the Garland of Meleager. Eleven of them are in the Greek Anthology, but the genuineness of two of these is very doubtful. Most of his epigrams are in praise of wine, and all of them are sportive. In some he describes the dedicatory offerings in the temple of Arsinoe, among which he mentions the hydraulic organ of Ctesibius. Besides this indication of his time, we know that he was the contemporary and rival of Callimachus and friend of Poseidippus of Pella. He lived therefore in the reign of Ptolemy II Philadelphus, and is to be classed with the Alexandrian school of poets. According to Athenaeus, he killed himself for love of a certain Glaucus.

Notes

References
"Hedylus", Smith, William (ed.) Dictionary of Greek and Roman Biography and Mythology. 2. London, 1870  
The Greek Anthology I, IV (Loeb Classical Library) translated by W. R. Paton. London: Heinemann, 1916

Further reading 

Brunck, Richard François Philippe, Analecta veterum poetarum Graecorum. Bauer, Strassburg 1772–1776. vol. I. p. 483 and vol. II. p. 526
 Floridi, Lucia, Edilo, ‘Epigrammi’. Introduzione, testo critico, traduzione e commento. Text und Kommentare, 64, Berlin, De Gruyter, 2020
 Jacobs, Christian Friedrich Wilhelm, Anthologia Graecae (1794–1814) vol. I. Leipzig. p. 233

Ancient Samians
Ancient Athenians
Epigrammatists of the Greek Anthology
Ptolemaic court
3rd-century BC Greek people
3rd-century BC poets
Ancient Greek poets